Yam Lal Kandel is a Nepalese politician, belonging to the Communist Party of Nepal (Unified Marxist-Leninist). He is the standing member of CPN-UML and parliamentary leader of CPN-UML in Karnali Province. In the 2008 Constituent Assembly election he was elected from the Surkhet-2 constituency, winning 16297 votes. He completed his postgraduation in Commerce from Tribhuvan University in 1990 and has been engaged in full-time politics since 1979. He was nominated as minister in 1998, parliamentarian in 1994 and mayor in 1992.

References

Living people
Communist Party of Nepal (Unified Marxist–Leninist) politicians
Year of birth missing (living people)
Members of the Provincial Assembly of Karnali Province
Nepal MPs 1994–1999

Members of the 1st Nepalese Constituent Assembly